Thomas Rudigoz is a French politician representing La République En Marche! He was elected to the French National Assembly on 18 June 2017, representing Rhône's 1st constituency.

Biography 
Prior to entering politics, he began a career as a journalist first at Le Progrés prior to working for Radio Chrétienne Francophone (RCF).

See also
 2017 French legislative election

References

Living people
Deputies of the 15th National Assembly of the French Fifth Republic
La République En Marche! politicians
Place of birth missing (living people)
1971 births
Members of Parliament for Rhône